Aquone (pronounced uh-KWAN-nee) is the home in Johnson City, Tennessee, where Samuel Cole Williams, noted Tennessee jurist and historian, lived in retirement. The home is listed on the National Register of Historic Places.

Aquone was built in 1925. It is a -story brick structure in the Colonial Revival style. Leland Cardwell, a Johnson City architect, designed the house, modeling it after the design of an unidentified Colonial mansion built in Maryland in 1748. The house is on a  lot between Roan Street and U.S. Highway 11E and is screened from those roads by trees and a terraced lawn. At the time of its construction, the site was north of the city limits of Johnson City.

The interior of Aquone is laid out according to the center hall plan, with an entrance hall and stairway flanked by a large formal living room on one side and a large formal dining room on the other side. An unusual feature of the house is a one and one-half-story library that is said to have been modeled after Sir Walter Scott's study in his home at Abbotsford House. The living room and dining room both have fireplaces with Georgian-influenced mantels. The library fireplace also has a Georgian design.

The name Aquone is reported to be a Cherokee word for "resting place."

References

Houses on the National Register of Historic Places in Tennessee
Johnson City, Tennessee
Houses completed in 1925
Colonial Revival architecture in Tennessee
Houses in Washington County, Tennessee
National Register of Historic Places in Washington County, Tennessee